The Sunday Independent is a weekly English-language newspaper based in Gauteng, South Africa. It is one of the titles under the Independent News & Media South Africa group acquired by Sekunjalo Media Consortium and was owned previously by Independent News & Media. The paper is distributed mainly in the Gauteng region, but can also be found around South Africa.

Ownership 
The Sunday Independent is owned by Sekunjalo Consortium, the controlling shareholder of the Independent Newspapers, which also owns Cape Times, The Star, Pretoria News, and Cape Argus among others.
 2013–present: Dr. Iqbal Survé

Digital presence 
The Sunday Independent has a digital presence via Independent Online (IOL) that provides local and international news stories, sports and entertainment news, as well as a social media presence. Its publisher follows a "digital first, print best" policy, seeking to ensure that all stories are carried on digital and print platforms.

The content published in The Sunday Independent focuses on daily national, local and international news and analysis. Its leader and opinion page offers a platform for readers to submit their views on topical news.

Products 
The Sunday Independent houses the Business Report newspaper (a widely-read financial newspaper in South Africa). The Sunday Independent is also carries supplements such as:

 Sunday Magazine (SM): it offers readers entertainment news and coverage of music, film, books, tech, lifestyle, and art.
 Classifieds

Supplements 
Business Report (Sunday) 
Life (Sunday)

Readership figures

See also
 List of newspapers in South Africa

References

1995 establishments in South Africa
English-language newspapers published in Africa
Mass media in Gauteng
Newspapers established in 1995
Weekly newspapers published in South Africa